Hilse is a German surname. Notable people with the surname include:

 Karsten Hilse (born 1964), German politician
 Peter Hilse (born 1962), German racing cyclist
 Wilhelm Hilse (1878–1940), German chess master

See also
 Hilbe
 Hilsea

German-language surnames